Police dog is a dog that is primarily trained to assist police or other law enforcement personnel.

Police dog may also refer to:

Police units
 Police Dog Unit, specialist unit of the Hong Kong Police
 Police K-9 Unit (Singapore), formerly "Police Dog Unit" of the Singapore Police
 Metropolitan Police Dog Support Unit of the London Metropolital Police
 Police Dog Training Centre of the Kerala Police Academy
 Airport Police Dog Unit of the Irish Airport Police Service

Entertainment
 Police Dog Story, a 1961 U.S. crime film
 Police Dog (film) (1955 film) UK crime film
 The Police Dog (TV series); an animated cartoon series
 Police Doggy (an EP release)
 Police Dog Hogan, a British band
 Dog×Police (2011 film) Japanese film

See also
 List of police dog breeds
 Working dog
 Detection dog
 Guard dog
 K9 (disambiguation)